Donald Martin (born 8 February 1940) is a former Australian field hockey player. He represented Australia at the 1964 (winning Bronze) and 1968 (winning Silver) Summer Olympics.  Don was inducted as a member of the Western Australian Hockey Champions on 23 May 2010.

Biography 
Don was born in Kuala Lumpur, moving to Australia in 1951 to attend boarding school at Aquinas College in Perth, where he was a member of the First XI Hockey team for 6 years from 1952-1957. He was selected in the state under 16 boys team in 1954/55. After leaving school, Don began playing in the West Australian Hockey Association First Division Competition.

In 1959, Don was selected to play in the state under 21 colts team, and then the state senior team in 1960-65 and 1968. He first represented Australia in 1961 playing in a winning Manning Memorial Cup victory over New Zealand, and then continued playing for Australia from 1962–64 and 1968. He was chosen in the 1964 Olympic team winning Bronze, and four years later in Mexico, winning Silver.

He was an Australian Badged Umpire and also a Western Australian State Senior Hockey Selector.

References

External links
 

Living people
Olympic field hockey players of Australia
People educated at Aquinas College, Perth
Medalists at the 1968 Summer Olympics
Medalists at the 1964 Summer Olympics
Olympic silver medalists for Australia
Olympic bronze medalists for Australia
1940 births
Australian male field hockey players
Field hockey players at the 1964 Summer Olympics
Field hockey players at the 1968 Summer Olympics
Olympic medalists in field hockey